Protomocerus gregorii is a species of beetle in the family Cerambycidae. It was described by Charles Joseph Gahan in 1898.

References

Prosopocerini
Beetles described in 1898